Democratic Unity Party may refer to:

Democratic Unity Party (Colombia)
Democratic United Party (South Korea)